The 2020 Kentucky Wildcats baseball team represented the University of Kentucky in the 2020 NCAA Division I baseball season. The Wildcats played their home games at Kentucky Proud Park.  On March 17, 2020, the Southeastern Conference canceled all intercollegiate sports for member institutions due to the COVID-19 pandemic, which terminated the season.

Previous season

The Wildcats finished 26–29 overall, and 7–23 in the conference.

2019 MLB Draft
The Wildcats had three players drafted in the 2019 MLB draft.

Players in bold are signees drafted from high school that will attend Kentucky.

Personnel

Roster

Coaching Staff

Schedule and results

Schedule Source:
*Rankings are based on the team's current ranking in the D1Baseball poll.

2020 MLB Draft

The Wildcats did not have any players selected in the 2020 MLB draft.

References

Kentucky
Kentucky Wildcats baseball seasons
Kentucky Wildcats baseball